Zinc finger MYM-type protein 3 is a protein that in humans is encoded by the ZMYM3 gene.

References

Further reading